The Slovenia national under-17 football team is the national under-17 football team of Slovenia and is controlled by the Football Association of Slovenia. The team competes in the UEFA European Under-17 Championship, which is held annually. Their first appearance in a major tournament took place in 2012, when they qualified for the 2012 UEFA European Under-17 Championship as the host country.

Players

Current squad
The following players were called up for the 2023 UEFA European Under-17 Championship qualification matches in November 2022.

Competitive record

FIFA U-17 World Cup

UEFA European Under-17 Championship

References

Under-17
Youth football in Slovenia
European national under-17 association football teams